Fukuoka Stock Exchange (FSE) is a stock exchange located in Fukuoka, Japan. It operates Q-Board, a special market for new companies. In August 2000, the exchange closed its trading floor and adopted the electronic trading system of Tokyo Stock Exchange. In January 2002, FSE reached an agreement with the four other Japanese stock exchanges and Japan Securities Dealers Association, JSDA to establish Japan Securities Clearing Corporation, JSCC.

See also
 List of East Asian stock exchanges
 List of stock exchanges

References

External links
 Official website

Stock exchanges in Japan